Line 6 is one of the sixteen lines of the Paris Métro rapid transit system. Following a semi-circular route around the southern half of the city above boulevards formed by the former wall of the 'Fermiers généraux' built between 1784 and 1791, it runs between Charles de Gaulle – Étoile in the west and Nation in the east.

Opened between 1900 and 1906 from Étoile to Place d'Italie, Line 6 was initially called 2 sud or circulaire sud ("southern circulator"), before being integrated for a long time with Line 5, while the section heading east to Nation opened in 1909. At that time, the rail tracks used by the current Line 6 were completed.

The line is considered one of the most pleasant lines on the Métro, due to is numerous views, sometimes exceptional, of many of Paris' most famous landmarks and monuments. With slightly more than 100 million riders in 2004, it is the sixth busiest line of the network.

Chronology 
 2 October 1900: The section between Étoile and Trocadéro opened as an extension of line 1.
 6 November 1903: The line was extended from Trocadéro to Passy and became known as line 2 Sud (2 South).
 24 April 1906: Line 2 Sud was extended from Passy to Place d'Italie.
 14 October 1907: Line 2 Sud from Étoile to Place d'Italie was incorporated into line 5.
 1 March 1909: Line 6 was opened between Place d'Italie and Nation.
 12 October 1942: The Étoile – Place d'Italie section was transferred from line 5 to the line 6 (Place d'Italie – Nation) in order to separate the underground and elevated sections of the metro (because the latter were more vulnerable to air attack).
 1974: The rails were converted for rubber-tyred trains in order to make the tracks quieter on the line's elevated sections.

 12 January 2023 Cascading of MP 73 to MP 89CC rolling stock begins.

South circulator (le circulaire sud)
Initially, the planners of the Métro envisaged a loop line similar to the Circle line of the London Underground that followed the route of the Wall of the Farmers-General. However, the difficulties of operating such a line forced a separation of the circle into two lines: the north and south circulators. An initial plan was to run trains from Gare d'Austerlitz to Gare de Lyon, and from there operate along Line 1 to Nation. The abandonment of the project allowed designers to choose a new route via Place d'Italie to Nation; this option, using Bercy, is the origin of what is now Line 6.

The northern circulator, now Line 2, opened in 1903, while the tracks from Étoile to Trocadéro (referred to as Line 2 Sud) opened on 2 October 1900 as part of a branch of Line 1 meant to serve the World Expo of that year. The line was extended southward to Passy three years later but was not fully opened and only allowed four-car trains.

Work on the line was not particularly difficult, apart from the occasional sewer displacements and land stabilisation around Denfert-Rochereau due to old mines. On the other hand, the crossing of the Seine at Passy was much trickier; from 1903 to 1906, the construction of a viaduct over the Pont de Bir-Hakeim gave way to another project unrelated to the Métro. The original bridge, built in 1878, was replaced with one made of metal supporting the railway viaduct above. To the east, another bridge had to be built above the Pont de Bercy. Both the overpasses and underground stations in this section were designed similarly to those of Line 2 Nord, although elevated stations on the southern half are fully covered with side-walls made of brick, not glass.

On 24 April 1906, the line from Étoile to Place d'Italie opened. In October of the next year, it was decided to merge the circulaire sud with Line 5, as a result running trains between Étoile and Gare du Nord via Austerlitz. This consolidation eliminated the 2 Sud designation.

Following the bombardment of Paris during World War I, elevated rapid transit lines became a defence system. Trains were no longer lit at night from February to July 1918. However, underground trains became incredibly dark and resulted in complaints from passengers and employees. La compagnie du chemin de fer métropolitain de Paris (CMP), which operated Line 5, was authorised to make electrical and lighting changes.

Line 6
At the time, Line 6 was confined to the railway between Place d'Italie and Nation. Infrastructure works were completed in 1906, but the CMP was in no hurry to open what was perceived as a low-profiting stretch of track. Upon the urging of the City of Paris, the CMP opened Line 6 on 1 March 1909 and remained this way until 1931, when the need for a link across the southern part of the city was needed to provide access to a cultural exhibition at the Bois de Vincennes. Engineers decided upon Line 6 taking over the section west of Place d'Italie so as to create a line from Étoile to Nation, with Line 5 ending at Place d'Italie. After the exhibit closed, the old service pattern returned.

On 6 October 1942, at the height of the German occupation of the city, Line 6 was continually operated. The northern extension of Line 5 to Pantin significantly elongated the line; it was agreed upon that the line was too long, and the remedy was to end Line 5 at Place d'Italie, thereby creating a full southern loop from Étoile to Nation as Line 6 stands today.

Rubber tyre conversion
A change in Line 6's operation occurred during the 1970s: Kléber station was expanded to four tracks with two island platforms, a rare arrangement in the Paris Métro, and converted to the line's control terminal, with Étoile acting as a simple turn-around stop.

After doing the same to Lines 1, 4, and 11, the RATP decided in 1971 to convert Line 6 to rubber-tyres for the sake of noise and vibration reduction not only to passengers but also residents near the elevated portions of the line. Work began the next year and finished in May 1974. Simultaneously, the line was equipped with a central control station.

The MP 73 rolling stock quickly replaced the old Sprague-Thomson during the month of July 1974. Unlike the MP 59 cars which also have rubber tyres, the MP 73 stock has grooved ones for better adhesion on the long stretches of elevated track; the rails are ribbed for the same reason. No adhesion failures have been reported since the switchover, even in heavy rain.

From 2023, with the ongoing modernization and upcoming automation of Line 4, the MP 73 are being replaced by renovated and shortened MP 89CC railcars.

Route and stations

Rolling Stock
Currently, the rolling stock on Line 6 is the MP 73 Rolling Stock. From January 2023 onwards, the MP 89 removed from Paris Métro Line 4 as they get replaced by automated trains are being transferred to line 6 to replace the MP 73. These trains have been refurbished into the Île-de-France Mobilités livery and reduced to 5 cars. 

MP 89CC # 48 was the first to enter revenue service on 12 January 2023.

Renamed stations

Themed or unique stations
Four stations on Line 6 have unique, cultural theming:

La Motte-Picquet – Grenelle contains several crests of the family of Toussaint-Guillaume Picquet de la Motte, who lends his name to the name of the street over which the station lies. Containing three blue chevrons and spearheads, a fresco represents the wall that used to be situated there.
Pasteur, once renovated similar to Mouton-Duvernet station, now has displays about medicine installed during the centennial of the Métro. The panels describe the evolution of biology and medicine since the work of Louis Pasteur and their legal framework and application.

Tourism
 Some of the stations on line 6 are built on a viaduct offering views of Paris. The view from the Pont de Bir-Hakeim between Passy and Bir-Hakeim has an especially breathtaking panorama on the Eiffel Tower. Line 6 passes near several places of interest:
 The Place de l'Étoile and the Arc de Triomphe.
 The place du Trocadéro.
 The Eiffel Tower and the Champ de Mars.
 Montparnasse, with its famous cafés and the Montparnasse Tower.
 Place d'Italie and the Butte aux Cailles.
 At Bercy, the Ministry of Finance, Paris-Bercy sports Arena and their gardens.
 Place de la Nation.

Gallery

See also

References

External links 

  RATP official website
  RATP english speaking website
  Interactive Map of the RER (from RATP's website)
  Interactive Map of the Paris métro (from RATP's website)
  Mobidf website, dedicated to the RER (unofficial)
  Metro-Pole website, dedicated to Paris public transports (unofficial)
  line6 Paris: Creative blog dedicated to the journey of travellers on Paris line6

 
Articles containing video clips
Railway lines opened in 1909